News Media Ownership v Findlay [1970] NZLR 1089  is a cited case in New Zealand regarding the defence of fair comment / honest opinion to a claim involving defamation.

Background
News Media's newspaper Truth ran a campaign to bring back caning. In the process, they made allegations against opposition MP Findlay that his views to the contrary were based on the fact that as he was a lawyer, he was more interested in the extra legal fees an anti-caning policy would bring him, rather than any perceived interest in victims of domestic violence.

Findlay, later sued for defamation, and was later awarded $15,000. NMO appealed.

Held
The Court of Appeal dismissed the appeal.

References

Court of Appeal of New Zealand cases
New Zealand tort case law
1970 in New Zealand law
1970 in case law